IAM (pronounced "I am") is a French hip hop group from Marseille. Formed in 1989, it comprises Akhenaton (AKH; Philippe Fragione), Shurik'n (Geoffroy Mussard), Khéops (Éric Mazel), Imhotep (Pascal Perez) and Kephren (François Mendy). IAM has several meanings, including Invasion Arrivée de Mars ("Invasion from Mars"; Mars is frequently used as a metaphor for Marseille in IAM songs). Another meaning is Imperial Asiatic Man, while AKH often refers to L'homme Impérial Asiatique.

Themes 
One of IAM's central themes in its songs is Africa. The group, which is one of the pioneer French rap groups, draws heavily in their music on allusions to Africa and particularly ancient Egypt. Their 1991 song "Les tam-tam de l'Afrique" was one of the first French rap hits to deal expressly with the issue of slavery. Using a sample of a Stevie Wonder song, "Les tam-tam de l'Afrique" focuses on the "abduction of its inhabitants, the Middle Passage, and the plantation system in the Americas".

IAM promotes an ideology that is based upon images associated with ancient Egypt, primarily upon the mythical allusions to pharaohs. By 1989 the group developed a unique rap style, mixing French beats and lyrics with Middle Eastern and Egyptian influences. Their stage names are of Egyptian origin; one of the group members, Eric Mazel, goes by the name Kheops, an allusion to the Egyptian pharaoh who built pyramids.  This connection with ancient Egypt allows IAM "to assert connections to the contemporary Arab world in an indirect way."

Indeed, this "pharaoism", as French rap music specialist Andre Previous calls it, represents an attempt to negotiate and maintain a cultural identity in the context of a social scene rife with racist and discriminatory ideologies. Because many Muslims don't feel at home in white French society, references to Arabic origins and Islamic fundamentalism are part of a highly socially contested discourse on identity politics in French music. Thus, by employing 'pharaoism' to hide these references to and elicitations of the Arab world, IAM successfully articulates its connections with the "Franco-Maghrebi" cause and establishes an important social space for itself. The pharaoist aspects of IAM's rap help the group stay in touch with its origins where some non-white French people have assimilated unquestioningly into the surrounding French culture. Therefore, the group's rap is both politically charged and defiant, as it attempts to subvert notions of racial superiority by "[proposing] multiracial alliance as an alternative to the 'old' [French] politics." Most importantly, rap provides IAM with a place to address social issues and speak out against racial intolerance where the group can actually be heard. In fact, the first single release from their second album, "Je danse le Mia", "went on to prove an enormous hit on the French mainstream", according to French radio station RFI Musique. In this way, the use of 'pharaoism' as a mystical and coded strategy for the injection of Arabic and Egyptian lyrics, ideas, and sentiments into the music is what makes it commercially viable. Otherwise, if the music were any more outright in its references to Arabic origins, white French conservatives might identify it with Islamic Fundamentalism's grips over North African diasporatic communities living in France and try to censor it and impede the cause it stands for.

"'Les tams-tams de l'Afrique' was one of the first hits of French rap and dealt expressly with slavery. Using a sample of 'Pastime Paradise' by Stevie Wonder, this track focused on the plunder of Africa, the abduction of its inhabitants, the Middle Passage, and the plantation system in the Americas".

Collaborations 
IAM have a long history of collaborations with the American hip hop group, the Wu-Tang Clan. IAM have sampled an Inspectah Deck lyric from the Wu-Tang Clan song "C.R.E.A.M", which states "Life as a shorty shouldn't be so rough" in their 1998 single, "Petit frère". Additionally, they featured a number of Wu-Tang affiliated artists on their 1997 single "La saga" and later members Method Man and Redman on their 2004 single "Noble Art" the video was directed by New York-based artist "Brad Digital". They were also featured in the song of RZA "Seul face à lui". These hip hop groups have a number of similarities, probably due to the fact that IAM member Akhenaton has listed Wu-Tang as one of his five favorite hip hop artists of all time. One notable example is that both groups have connections to Islam. The Wu-Tang Clan are known members of the Five-Percent Nation and often include Islamic references in their music. On the previously mentioned IAM collaboration, "La saga," rapper Prodigal Sunn states that "IAM, sunz of man from the royal fam, never ate ham, never gave a damn", referencing the dietary restrictions that Muslims have to follow. Similarly, French rappers IAM have used their music to display an alternative Muslim identity [Ref. necessary]. IAM also collaborated with US rapper Lucas on the song "Spin the Globe" with rappers from 5 different countries spitting in 5 different languages showcasing the universal appeal and voice of hip hop.

Discography

Albums

Mixtapes 
1989: IAM Concept
2007: Official Mixtape
2012: Assassins Scribes
2013: Assassins Scribes 2

Live albums 

DVD Live
2007: Live au Dôme de Marseille (DVD)

Compilation albums

Singles 

Other releases
 1997: "La saga" (featuring Timbo King, Dreddy Krueger and Prodigal Sunn)
 2004: "Second souffle"
 2007: "Une autre brique dans le mur"
 2007: "Ca vient de la rue"
 2007: "Offishall
 2008: "Coupe Le Cake"

Discography (solo projects) 

Soundtracks

References

External links 

 Official website
 IAM Concept

French hip hop groups
Virgin Records artists
Musical groups from Marseille
Rappers from Bouches-du-Rhône
1989 establishments in France
Musical groups established in 1989